Pseudocentrotus is a genus of echinoderms belonging to the family Strongylocentrotidae.

The species of this genus are found in Japan.

Species:

Pseudocentrotus depressus 
Pseudocentrotus stenoporus

References

Strongylocentrotidae
Echinoidea genera